METIS is a software package for graph partitioning that implements various multilevel algorithms. METIS' multilevel approach has three phases and comes with several algorithms for each phase:
 Coarsen the graph by generating a sequence of graphs G0, G1, ..., GN, where G0 is the original graph and for each 0 ≤ i ≤ j ≤ N, the number of vertices in Gi is greater than the number of vertices in Gj.
 Compute a partition of GN
 Project the partition back through the sequence in the order of GN, ..., G0, refining it with respect to each graph.
The final partition computed during the third phase (the refined partition projected onto G0) is a partition of the original graph.

References

External links
 METIS website

Graph algorithms
Mathematical software